Phebalium squamulosum , commonly known as scaly phebalium or forest phebalium, is a species of shrub or slender tree that is endemic to eastern Australia. It has smooth branches covered with rust-coloured scales, linear to elliptical or egg-shaped leaves with the narrower end towards the base, and pale to bright yellow flowers in umbels with rust-coloured or silvery scales on the back.

Description
It has smooth branchlets covered with rust-coloured scales. The upper surface of the leaves is more or less glabrous but the lower side is covered with silvery to rust-coloured scales and star-shaped hairs.

Taxonomy
Phebalium squamulosum was first formally described in 1805 by Étienne Pierre Ventenat in his book Jardin de la Malmaison and was the first species in the genus to be described.

In 1970, Paul Wilson described ten subspecies, eight of which are now accepted by the Australian Plant Census:
P. squamulosum subsp. alpinum (Benth.) Paul G.Wilson
P. squamulosum subsp. argenteum Paul G.Wilson 
P. squamulosum subsp. coriaceum Paul G.Wilson
P. squamulosum subsp. gracile Paul G.Wilson
P. squamulosum subsp. lineare Paul G.Wilson
P. squamulosum subsp. ozothamnoides (F.Muell.) Paul G.Wilson
P. squamulosum subsp. parvifolium Paul G.Wilson
P. squamulosum Vent. subsp. squamulosum

There are many intergrades between subspecies and it is sometimes difficult to satisfactorily assign some plants to a taxon.

Distribution and habitat
Scaly phebalium is widespread, mainly growing in heath and forest on sandstone. It is found in northern and south-eastern Queensland, eastern New South Wales and eastern Victoria.

Use in horticulture
Phebalium squamulosum is cultivated as an ornamental flowering shrub. The species is frost tolerant and performs best  in a well-drained, partially shaded position with a cool, moist root zone.

Image gallery

References

squamulosum
Flora of New South Wales
Flora of Queensland
Flora of Victoria (Australia)
Taxa named by Étienne Pierre Ventenat
Plants described in 1805